
Gmina Wilkołaz is a rural gmina (administrative district) in Kraśnik County, Lublin Voivodeship, in eastern Poland.

Villages
Gmina Wilkołaz contains the villages and settlements of Ewunin, Marianówka, Obroki, Ostrów, Ostrów-Kolonia, Pułankowice, Rudnik, Rudnik-Kolonia, Wilkołaz, Wilkołaz Dolny, Wilkołaz Drugi, Wilkołaz Trzeci, Wólka Rudnicka, Zalesie and Zdrapy.

Neighbouring gminas
Gmina Wilkołaz is bordered by the gminas of Borzechów, Kraśnik, Niedrzwica Duża, Strzyżewice, Urzędów and Zakrzówek.

References

Polish official population figures 2006

Wilkolaz
Kraśnik County